Gilbert C. Harris (? - 1921) was a wig maker in Boston, Massachusetts. He moved to Boston from Virginia. He served as treasurer of the National Negro Business League. He supplied wigs to theater companies including via a mail order business. Henry Wilson Savage was among his clients. Charlotte Cushman and Henry Irving were among his clients.

He was born in Petersburg, Virginia. He moved from Virginia to Boston in 1892. He co-founded an Odd Fellows Lodge. He acquired and continued to operate Frenchman M. Alphonse Gilbert's Gilbert & Co. wig business at 732 Washington Street.

A 1918 book documented him as being "mulatto".

See also
Mary L. Johnson, maker of the Johnson Hair Food pomade and a wig maker, scientific scalp specialist, and hair "culturist"
L. C. Parrish, wig maker and hair weaver in Boston
T. J. Jones (businessman), Boston manufacturer of Lusterine

References

Year of birth missing
1921 deaths